Mesochori) may refer to several settlements in Greece:

Mesochori, Anatoliki Mani, a village in East Mani 
Mesochori, Drama, a village in Paranesti 
Mesochori, Evrytania, a village in Karpenisi 
Mesochori, Florina, a village and a community in Florina 
Mesochori, Heraklion, a village and a community in Archanes-Asterousia 
Mesochori, Karpathos, a village and a community in Karpathos 
Mesochori, Larissa, a village and a community in Elassona
Mesochori, Messenia, a village and a community in Pylos-Nestor 
Mesochori, Monemvasia, a village and a community in Monemvasia 
Mesochori, Phthiotis, a village and a community in Lamia 
Mesochori, Rhodope, a village in Komotini